Hukoutherium is an extinct genus of mesonychid which lived during the middle Paleocene in Asia and was named by Chow. The genus became extinct during the Eocene

Hukoutherium is known from a mandible with incisors, canines, and broken dentaries, a crushed crania and fragmentary bones.

Species
Genus Hukoutherium
Hukoutherium ambigum
Hukoutherium shimemensis

External links
Paleo Data
Taxamony

Mesonychids
Paleocene mammals
Eocene mammals
Eocene genus extinctions
Extinct mammals of Asia
Prehistoric placental genera